The ARIA Singles Chart ranks the best-performing singles in Australia. Its data, published by the Australian Recording Industry Association, is based collectively on each single's weekly physical and digital sales. In 2009, 14 singles claimed the top spot, including Lady Gaga's "Poker Face", which started its peak position in late 2008. Seven acts achieved their first number-one single in Australia, either as a lead or featured artist: Jessica Mauboy, The Fray, Taylor Swift, A. R. Rahman, Nicole Scherzinger, David Guetta, Vanessa Amorosi and Kesha.

The Black Eyed Peas earned three number-one singles during the year for "Boom Boom Pow", "I Gotta Feeling" and "Meet Me Halfway". Kesha's "Tik Tok" was longest-running number-one single in 2009, having topped the ARIA Singles Chart for eight consecutive weeks. Flo Rida's "Right Round", The Black Eyed Peas' "I Gotta Feeling", and Guetta's "Sexy Bitch" each spent seven weeks at the number-one spot.

Chart history

Number-one artists

See also
2009 in music
List of number-one albums of 2009 (Australia)
List of Top 25 singles for 2009 in Australia
List of top 10 singles in 2009 (Australia)

References

	 

	 
Number-one singles
Australia Singles
2009